The following low-power television stations broadcast on digital or analog channel 49 in the United States:

 K49IT-D in Hagerman, Idaho, to move to channel 18
 K49KT-D in Bend, Oregon, to move to channel 36
 K49KV-D in Stemilt, etc., Washington, to move to channel 17
 K49LJ-D in Casper, Wyoming, to move to channel 22
 K49LK-D in North Platte, Nebraska, to move to channel 20
 KRLB-LD in Richland, etc., Washington, to move to channel 29

The following television stations, which are no longer licensed, formerly broadcast on digital or analog channel 49:
 K49AT in Vernal, etc., Utah
 K49BB-D in Follett, Texas
 K49CU in Walker, Minnesota
 K49DV in Beeville-Refugio, Texas
 K49EA-D in Crowley Lake, California
 K49EK in Santa Barbara, California
 K49ES in Carlsbad, New Mexico
 K49FC in St. Louis, Missouri
 K49GB in Emery, Utah
 K49GD in Spanish Fork, Utah
 K49GT in Snyder, Texas
 K49HV in Martinez, California
 K49IL-D in Tecolote, New Mexico
 K49KF-D in Los Alamos/Espanola, New Mexico
 K49KQ in Little Falls, Minnesota
 KBSC-LP in Brookings, Oregon
 KTLD-LP in Odessa, Texas
 KYLU-LP in Lubbock, Texas
 W49AP in Roanoke, Virginia
 W49CL in Miami, Florida
 WCKV-LP in Clarksville, etc., Tennessee
 WCYA-LD in Midland, Michigan
 WEEJ-LD in Jacksonville, Illinois
 WOCH-CD in Chicago, Illinois
 WTBL-CD in Lenoir, North Carolina
 WXID-LP in Marietta, Georgia

References

49 low-power TV stations in the United States